Sherlyn Cadapan (  disappeared June 26, 2006) and Karen Empeño (  disappeared June 26, 2006) were students who both disappeared in Hagonoy, Bulacan, on June 26, 2006, while doing their school project.

Background 
Sherlyn Cadapan was the second child born in the Cadapan family and was a sport science senior at the time of her disappearance. According to her mother, Linda Cadapan, she was a sprinter under the varsity scholarship. Cadapan also had joined protests against the rising fuel prices and human rights abuses under the Arroyo administration; her political views disappointed her mother back then. Karen Empeño was a graduating sociology student and she was described as friendly by her mother.

Disappearance
On June 26, 2006, Cadapan and Empeño, both alumni of the University of the Philippines Diliman, were abducted by military men in Hagonoy, Bulacan, during the tenure of President Gloria Macapagal Arroyo, and were accused of being members of the Communist Party of the Philippines. This incident took place at the time of a fierce conflict in Central Luzon between the government and the communist New People's Army. According to the official investigation, eyewitness Raymond Manalo stated that General Jovito Palparan tortured Sherlyn by hitting her mouth and punching her breasts and stomach area until they bled. Palparan also slammed wooden planks against the victim so that Sherlyn would admit to being a communist, while Sherlyn kept on saying that she wanted to go home to her parents. Manalo also noted that he saw the military stealing from nearby villagers, burning dead bodies using gasoline, and shooting a man who was riding a carabao due to farm work. Manalo's account also noted that in April 2007, he saw Sherlyn lying naked on a chair that had fallen on the floor, her wrists tied together and one leg tied down, while being hit by wooden planks, electrocuted, and afterwards being half-drowned. The military also played with her body, poking wooden objects inside Sherlyn's vagina, after finding out that Sherlyn was going to write a letter to somebody. Sherlyn, due to intense torture, blurted out that the letter was Karen's idea. The military then dragged Karen out from her cell, stripped her naked, tied her wrists and ankles, then beat her, subjected her to water torture, burned her with cigarettes, and raped her with pieces of wood. Manalo afterwards washed the two women's clothes, including their blood-drenched panties. He also noted that the bucket containing urine from the two women was filled with 'chunks of blood'.

Aftermath
The leftist political party Bagong Alyansang Makabayan accused the Armed Forces of the Philippines of being involved in the women's disappearance and alleged deaths. Former general and former congressman Jovito Palparan–known as Berdugo ("Butcher") for his involvement–was implicated by the Philippine government in 2011 for kidnapping, torture, and murder. He was arrested for the disappearances in 2014. Palparan ran for senator in the 2016 elections, but lost.

Forced disappearances are commemorated every All Saints' Day by their relatives.

Conviction
On September 17, 2018, Palparan was sentenced to life imprisonment after being convicted for his involvement in the disappearances. Lieutenant Colonel Felipe Anotado and S/Sgt. Edgardo Osorio were convicted alongside Palparan for the kidnapping of Cadapan and Empeño.

See also
Extrajudicial killings and forced disappearances in the Philippines
List of people who disappeared

References

2000s missing person cases
2006 crimes in the Philippines
Anti-communism in the Philippines
Duos
History of Bulacan
Human rights abuses in the Philippines
June 2006 events in the Philippines
Missing person cases in the Philippines
Rape in the Philippines
Unsolved crimes in the Philippines
History of women in the Philippines